Sociedade Recreativa Almancilense (abbreviated as SR Almancilense) is a Portuguese football club based in Almancil, Loulé.

History
SR Almancilense currently play in the Campeonato de Portugal which is the third tier of Portuguese football. The club was founded in 1935 and they play their home matches at the Estádio Municipal de Almancil in Almancil.

The club is affiliated to Associação de Futebol do Algarve.

Players

Current squad

Honours

League
Algarve Football Association Division One
Winners (3): 1987-88, 1997–98, 2014–15
Algarve Football Association Division Two
Winners (1): 1996-97

Cups
Algarve Football Association Taça do Algarve
Winners (1): 2015-16

See also
S.R. Almancilense players
S.R. Almancilense managers

References

External links
Official Facebook page 

Football clubs in Portugal
Association football clubs established in 1935
1935 establishments in Portugal